Keshava Parasaran (born 9 October 1927) is a lawyer from India. He was Advocate General of Tamil Nadu during President's rule in 1976, Solicitor General of India under the then  Prime Minister Indira Gandhi and then, Attorney General of India under Prime Ministers Indira Gandhi and Rajiv Gandhi between 1983 and 1989, till the end of  Rajiv Gandhi's tenure. Parasaran was awarded the Padma Bhushan in the year 2003 and Padma Vibhushan in the year 2011. In June 2012, he received a presidential nomination to the Rajya Sabha, the upper house of India's parliament, for a period of six years. He is a member of Shri Ram Janmabhoomi Teerth Kshetra. In 2019 the Central Government appointed him to lead the Shri Ram Janmabhoomi Teerth Kshetra. However later, Mahant Nritya Gopal Das was appointed to lead the trust. The trust will oversee the construction of Ram Temple in Ayodhya.

Early life and education 
Born in Srirangam district of Tamil Nadu, Parasaran is the son of Kesava Iyengar, a lawyer, and Shrimati Ranganayaki. While pursuing his BL (now, BA. LLB), he was awarded the Shri Justice C.V. Kumaraswami Sastri Sanskrit Medal and Justice Shri V. Bhashyam Iyengar Gold Medal in Hindu Law. During the Bar Council examination, he received the Justice Shri K.S. Krishnaswamy Iyengar Medal.

Career 
Parasaran began his legal practice before the Supreme Court in 1958. He defended the National Judicial Appointments Commission in 2014, as a member of the Rajya Sabha. In a career spanning over six decades, Parasaran is known for his contribution in the following landmark cases:

Sabarimala case 
In the Sabarimala case, Parasaran defended the Nair Service Society by arguing that the ban restricting the entry of menstruating women in the Sabarimala Temple is right. He recited paragraphs from the Ramayana to explain the concept of Naishtika Brahmacharya, that is, the celibate nature of the deity, Ayyappan.

Ayodhya land dispute case 
Parasaran successfully fought the Ayodhya land dispute case for the Hindu parties. Furthremore, he has been named as a trustee in the Shri Ram Janmabhoomi Teerth Kshetra. He was described as "Pitamah of Indian Bar" by Sanjay Kishan Kaul for his contribution.

Personal life 
In 1949, he married Saroja, and has three sons, Mohan Parasaran, who was Solicitor General of India during the Congress led UPA 2 Government, Balaji Parasaran, and Satish Parasaran and two daughters.

Award 
 Padma Bhushan (2003)
 Padma Vibhushan (2011)
 Most Eminent Senior Citizen (2019)
 Shri Narayan Guru award (Swarajya award) (2020)

References

1927 births
Living people
20th-century Indian lawyers
Recipients of the Padma Vibhushan in public affairs
Recipients of the Padma Bhushan in public affairs
Attorneys General of India
Senior Advocates in India
Nominated members of the Rajya Sabha